Fulk I FitzWarin ( born 1115, died 1170/1) (alias  Fulke, Fouke, FitzWaryn, FitzWarren, Fitz Warine, etc., Latinised to Fulco Filius Warini, "Fulk son of Warin")  was a powerful marcher lord seated at Whittington Castle in Shropshire in England on the border with Wales, and also at Alveston in Gloucestershire. His grandson was Fulk III FitzWarin (c. 1160–1258) the subject of the famous mediaeval legend or "ancestral romance" entitled Fouke le Fitz Waryn, himself the grandfather of  Fulk V FitzWarin, 1st Baron FitzWarin (1251-1315).

Origins
Fulk I Fitzwarin was the son of Warin (his patronymic representing the Norman French Fitz, in modern French fils de, 'son of'). The later mediaeval romance Fouke le Fitz Waryn gives the father's name as Warin de Meer, others deriving him from Metz, Loraine.  This Warin, the family's earliest known ancestor, is a "shadowy or mythical figure" about whom little is certain. It is however generally believed that the head of the Warin family came to England during the reign of William the Conqueror (1066-1087). Neither Warin nor his son Fulk I were tenants-in-chief (feudal barons who were direct vassals of the king) during William's reign.  Instead, the family's lands were obtained from later kings.

Career
Fulk I FitzWarin was rewarded by King Henry II (1154-1189) for his support of his mother  Empress Matilda in her civil war with King Stephen (1135-1154) and conferred to him in 1153 the royal manor of Alveston in Gloucestershire and in 1149 the manor of Whadborough in Leicestershire.

Marriage and children
Fulk I married a lady, Malet Peveral, daughter of Pagan Peveral and they had children including the following:

Fulk II FitzWarin (fl. 1194), son and heir who held his father's lands following his death in 1170/1.
William de Brightley, younger son, who according to Sir William Pole (d.1635) was granted by his father "in King Henry 2 tyme" (i.e. between 1154 and 1189) the Devonshire manor of Brightley in the parish of Chittlehampton, which he made his seat and where his descendants lived for many generations having adopted "de Brightley" as their surname in lieu of "FitzWarin".

References

Year of birth unknown
1170s deaths
12th-century English nobility
People from Shropshire
12th-century English landowners
People from Alveston
1115 births